Neaspilota is a genus of fruit flies in the family Tephritidae.

Species
Neaspilota achilleae Johnson, 1900
Neaspilota aenigma Freidberg & Mathis, 1986
Neaspilota alba (Loew, 1861)
Neaspilota albidipennis (Loew, 1861)
Neaspilota albiseta Freidberg & Mathis, 1986
Neaspilota appendiculata Freidberg & Mathis, 1986
Neaspilota brunneostigmata Doane, 1899
Neaspilota callistigma Freidberg & Mathis, 1986
Neaspilota dolosa Benjamin, 1934
Neaspilota floridana Ibrahim, 1982
Neaspilota footei Freidberg & Mathis, 1986
Neaspilota isochela Freidberg & Mathis, 1986
Neaspilota pubescens Freidberg & Mathis, 1986
Neaspilota punctistigma Benjamin, 1934
Neaspilota reticulata Norrbom & Foote, 2000
Neaspilota signifera (Coquillett, 1894)
Neaspilota stecki Freidberg & Mathis, 1986
Neaspilota vernoniae (Loew, 1861)
Neaspilota viridescens Quisenberry, 1949
Neaspilota wilsoni Blanc & Foote, 1961

References

Tephritinae
Tephritidae genera
Diptera of North America